Vladislav Polzounov is a Russian sprint canoer who competed in the late 1990s. He won five medals at the ICF Canoe Sprint World Championships with one silver (C-4 1000 m: 1997) and four bronzes (C-2 200 m: 1998, C-4 200 m: 2001, C-4 500 m: 1997, 1998).

References

Living people
Russian male canoeists
Year of birth missing (living people)
ICF Canoe Sprint World Championships medalists in Canadian